Jovanka Radičević (born 23 October 1986) is a Montenegrin handball player for RK Krim Mercator and a former player of the Montenegrin national team. She is considered to be the best right wing of all-time.

International honours 
EHF Champions League:
:Winner: 2013
: Silver Medalist: 2012, 2017, 2018
EHF Cup Winners' Cup:
: Winner: 2006, 2010
European Championship:
: Winner: 2012
: Bronze Medalist: 2022
Olympic Games:
: Silver Medalist: 2012

Individual awards
 All-Star Right Wing of the European Championship: 2012, 2020, 2022
 All-Star Team of the EHF Champions League: 2014, 2016, 2019, 2020
 All-Star Right Wing of the World Championship: 2015, 2019
 Handball-Planet.com All-Star Right Wing: 2015, 2017, 2018,  2019
EHF Champions League Top Scorer: 2020
 Balkan-Handball.com Ex-Yugoslavian Handballer of the Year: 2018, 2019
 Gala Premiilor Handbalului Românesc Liga Națională Right Wing of the Season: 2019

References

External links

 

Living people
Montenegrin female handball players
1986 births
Sportspeople from Podgorica
Expatriate handball players
Montenegrin expatriate sportspeople in Hungary
Montenegrin expatriate sportspeople in North Macedonia
Montenegrin expatriate sportspeople in Romania
Győri Audi ETO KC players
Handball players at the 2012 Summer Olympics
Handball players at the 2016 Summer Olympics
Handball players at the 2020 Summer Olympics
Olympic handball players of Montenegro
Olympic medalists in handball
Olympic silver medalists for Montenegro
Medalists at the 2012 Summer Olympics
Mediterranean Games medalists in handball
Mediterranean Games bronze medalists for Montenegro
Competitors at the 2009 Mediterranean Games